Ruggero Ferrario (7 October 1897 – 5 April 1976) was an Italian racing cyclist and Olympic champion in track cycling.

He won a gold medal in team pursuit at the 1920 Summer Olympics in Antwerp (with Arnaldo Carli, Franco Giorgetti and Primo Magnani).

He won the first Coppa Bernocchi race in 1919.

References

1897 births
1976 deaths
Italian male cyclists
Olympic gold medalists for Italy
Cyclists at the 1920 Summer Olympics
Olympic cyclists of Italy
Italian track cyclists
Cyclists from Milan
Olympic medalists in cycling
Medalists at the 1920 Summer Olympics
20th-century Italian people